Suravaram may refer to:
 Suravaram (name), Indian surname includes list of people with this name

Places
 Suravaram, village in Jalumuru mandal, Srikakulam district, Andhra Pradesh, India
Suravaram, village in Santhakavati mandal, Srikakulam district, Andhra Pradesh, India
Suravaram, former mandal containing Kommuru, Krishna district, Andhra Pradesh
Suravaram, village in Dummugudem division, Khammam district, Telangana, India
Suravaram, village in Agiripalle mandal, Krishna district, Andhra Pradesh, India